C. I. D. is a 1965 Indian Telugu-language action film, produced by Nagireddy-Chakrapani under the Vijaya Productions banner and directed by Tapi Chanakya. The film stars N. T. Rama Rao and Jamuna, with the music composed by Ghantasala. The film is a remake of the Tamil movie Dheiva Thaai (1964).

Plot
Chalapathi is a poker player who loses all of his wealth due to his vices. He fights with fellow gambler, Kumar, brother of police officer S. P. Ramadasu, and Kumar dies. Chalapati flees and comes under a running train, so everyone believes that he has died. 

Ramadasu helps Chalapathi's wife, Parvathi, by getting her a job as a nurse and providing for her son Ravi's education. Ravi grows up and becomes a CID Inspector. 

Chalapathi, who is still alive, now goes by the name of Baba. He pretends to be a money lender, but is actually a gangster. He and his gang rob a bank in Bombay and Ravi takes on the case. Baba and his associate Uddandam try to kill Ravi multiple times, but he is able to escape and almost surrounds the gang. 

Meanwhile, Kumar's daughter Vasantha is brought up by Ramadasu and comes in contact with Ravi. They fall in love and plan their marriage. However, Ramadasu's mother discovers that Ravi's father is the killer of Kumar, and she breaks up the match. But after some time, Parvathi is able to convince Ramadasu to set up the match again. 

Ravi suspects that Baba is behind all these crimes, so he goes to Baba's shop and asks for money in exchange for his pocket watch. Baba orders his associate Uddandam to kill Ravi, but he sees Parvathi's picture on the watch and realizes that Ravi is his son. Uddandam throws a knife at Ravi, but Baba puts himself in its path and is injured. Ravi joins him in the hospital and nurse Parvathi recognizes her husband. Parvathi asks Baba not to reveal the truth to Ravi, because she hid the real version of the facts. 

After recovering, Baba invites Ravi to his shop, and he visits along with Vasantha. Baba presents a necklace and chain to him and Ravi takes them by force. But Parvathi returns the chain to Baba and asks him to have no contact with her son. Uddandam uses the situation to his advantage, by complaining to the police that Ravi has taken a bribe, and Ravi is suspended. He asks for a chance to prove his innocence, and seeks vengeance against Baba. 

After learning of Ravi's suspension, Baba beats Uddandam and revolts against him. In that quarrel, Baba kills Uddandam and runs away. Ravi chases him, and Baba hides in Ravi's house. When Ravi is about to arrest him, Parvathi begs Ravi to leave him, but Ravi is not ready to listen and she dies at Baba's feet. In the end, Ravi discovers that Baba is his father Chalapathi through Ramadasu and his mother has sacrificed her entire life for him. The movie ends with Ravi and Vasantha's wedding.

Cast
N. T. Rama Rao as Ravi
Jamuna as Vasantha  
Gummadi as Chalapathi / Baba
Rajanala as Udandam
Mikkilineni as S. P. Ramadasu
Ramana Reddy as Vyaghreswara Bhagavatar 
Pandari Bai as Parvathi 
Hemalatha as Avva
Meena Kumari as Chenchela

Soundtrack

Music composed by Ghantasala. Lyrics were written by Pingali Nagendra Rao.

References

Bibliography

External links
 

1960s Telugu-language films
1965 films
1960s action films
Indian black-and-white films
Films scored by Ghantasala (musician)
Indian action films
Telugu remakes of Tamil films
Films directed by Tapi Chanakya
Fictional portrayals of police departments in India